Lordship is a territory held by a lord.

Lordship may also refer to: 
 Lordship, the office of a British peer of any rank
 Lordship (horse), a New Zealand standardbred racehorse
 Lordship (ward), Hackney, London, England
 Lordship, Connecticut, United States
 Lordship, County Louth, Ireland
 Marcher lordships, a territory in the March between and England and Wales

See also
 Lordship Lane (disambiguation)